The 1985–86 Elitserien season was the 11th season of the Elitserien, the top level of ice hockey in Sweden. 10 teams participated in the league, and Farjestads BK won the championship.

Standings

Playoffs

External links
 Swedish Hockey League official site
1986 Swedish national championship finals at SVT's open archive 

Swedish Hockey League seasons
1985–86 in Swedish ice hockey
Swedish